The 2023 Nigerian Senate election in the Federal Capital Territory will be held on 25 February 2023, to elect the single federal Senator from the Federal Capital Territory, with the senatorial district being coterminous with the Territory at-large. The election will coincide with the 2023 presidential election, as well as other elections to the Senate and elections to the House of Representatives; with state elections being held two weeks later. 

Primaries were held between 4 April and 9 June 2022 with incumbent Senator Philips Tanimu Aduda being renominated by the Peoples Democratic Party while the All Progressives Congress nominated Angulu Zakari—former House of Representatives member for Abaji/Gwagwalada/Kwali/Kuje.

Background
The Federal Capital Territory Senatorial District covers the entire territory and its local government areas of Abaji, Abuja, Bwari, Gwagwalada, Kuje, and Kwali. The incumbent Philips Tanimu Aduda (PDP) was re-elected with 61.4% of the vote in 2019 and is seeking re-election.

In other elections in the territory, the state was easily won by PDP presidential nominee Atiku Abubakar in addition to the PDP gaining both of the House of Representatives seats. Similarly, in 2022, the PDP won most councillorships but split the area council chairmanships in the local elections.

At the start of the 2019–2023 term, Aduda was retained his position as Minority Whip. He then became Minority Leader in June 2022 to replace the defecting Abia South Senator, Enyinnaya Abaribe.

Overview

Summary

Primary elections

All Progressives Congress 

On the primary date, an indirect primary at the National Women Centre in Abuja resulted in victory for Angulu Zakari—former House of Representatives member for Abaji/Gwagwalada/Kwali/Kuje. Results showed Zakari defeating first runner-up Dayo Benjamins-Laniyi by a 81% margin but controversy arose immediately as party members protested that the primary had been manipulated in favour of Zakari. Members critical of the primary conduct noted the sudden shift in the primary venue from the advertised Moshood Abiola National Stadium to the Women Centre in addition to the purported failure to publish the delegates' list or the voters' register. Benjamins-Laniyi supporters decried the imposition of Zakari as an example of the APC's failure to provide fair opportunities for women candidates but the primary's electoral committee chairman claimed that the election was free and fair.

People's Democratic Party 

The primary, held at the Nicon Luxury Hotel in Abuja, resulted in the renomination of Aduda after his two challengers stepped down for him. In his acceptance speech, Aduda thanked the electoral committee for ensuring peaceful primaries and assured his constituents of good representation.

Campaign
As campaigning intensified in late 2022, OrderPaper Nigeria organized a town hall for FCT National Assembly candidates on 5 December. While minor party candidates gave speeches and offered proposals, both Aduda and Zakari did not attend the event. By early February, reporting showed that Aduda and Zakari were no longer the only major candidates as Ireti Kingibe—the LP nominee who is the wife of Baba Gana Kingibe and sister of former First Lady Ajoke Muhammed—and Anthony Ezekwugo—the APGA nominee. Pundits focused on Aduda's strength in rural areas, Zakari's reliance on the votes of his native Gwagwalada, Kingibe's boost from supporters of Peter Obi, and Ezekwugo's targeting of non-indigenes originally from the South-East. Overall, it was noted that Aduda, Kingibe, and Ezekwugo were targeting the same formerly PDP base thus the split could help Zakari.

Election debates and town halls

General election

Results

By federal constituency
The results of the election by federal constituency.

By local government area 
The results of the election by local government area.

Notes

See also 
 2023 Nigerian Senate election
 2023 Nigerian elections

References 

Federal Capital Territory senatorial elections
2023 Federal Capital Territory elections
Federal Capital Territory Senate elections